Mazubon-e Sofla (also Romanized as Māzūbon-e Soflá) is a village in Baladeh Rural District, Khorramabad District, Tonekabon County, Mazandaran Province, Iran. At the 2006 census, its population was 1,108, in 296 families.

References 

Populated places in Tonekabon County